Vivian Ernest Coltman-Allen (23 July 1908 – 1 February 2006), known professionally as Ernest Dudley, was an English actor, dramatist, novelist, journalist and screenwriter.

Biography

Personal life 
Vivian Ernest Coltman-Allen was born in Dudley, Worcestershire, and educated at Taplow School. He began his theatrical career acting in repertory in Ireland, later joining Charles Doran's Shakespeare company. He met and married the actress Jane Graham, while they were on tour in 1930.

He and his wife had a daughter together. He was widowed in 1981 and remained working on novels, stories and scripts until his death, aged 97.

Career 
The actor and scriptwriter Ernest Dudley was the creator of the hit BBC radio crime series Dr Morelle and also the television series The Armchair Detective. The Dr Morelle — 'the man you love to hate!' — series which was hugely popular during the 1940s and 1950s and originally starred Dennis Arundell in the title role. In the fifties the role was given to Cecil Parker, who co-starred with Sheila Sim.

Dudley created Dr Morelle for a BBC Radio anthology programme Monday Night at Eight during the Second World War. He featured the character in many short stories and numerous novels as well as a stage play Dr Morelle, which he co-wrote with Arthur Watkyn.

He appeared in the West End in numerous small parts, before taking a job with The Daily Mail during the late 1930s as a society reporter. He also began writing plays and crime series for BBC Radio. His popular radio series The Armchair Detective attracted more than ten million listeners a week. A TV series followed, as well as a film in 1952. In 1956 he bought a Jowett Jupiter with an unusual special body by Harold Radford. This had the merit (to Dudley) of being completely unlike any other car, and therefore unidentifiable.

Films
 The Armchair Detective (1952)… as himself

Novels
 The Harassed Hero (1954)
 The Dark Bureau (1950)

Radio Plays
 Crime Chasers Ltd
 SOS Sally
 Mr Walker Wants to Know
 Monday Night at Eight … Dr Morelle, with Dennis Arundell
 The Armchair Detective (1942)
 The House of Unspeakable Secrets (1967), with Leslie Phillips

Screenplays
 Concerning Mr. Martin (1937)
 Lassie from Lancashire (1938)
 Dial 999 (1938)
 The Armchair Detective (1952)
 Schlitz Playhouse of Stars...Secrets of the Old Bailey (1958)...television episode (story)

Stage Plays
 Dr Morelle

Television Series
 The Armchair Detective

External links

 The Radio Detectives – A Case for Dr Morelle BBC radio programme on famous detectives with Professor Jeffrey Richards – streaming audio
 interview British Entertainment History Project

1908 births
2006 deaths
English radio writers
English male journalists
English male screenwriters
English dramatists and playwrights
English short story writers
English male stage actors
People from Dudley
British male dramatists and playwrights
English male short story writers
English male novelists
20th-century English novelists
20th-century British dramatists and playwrights
20th-century British short story writers
20th-century English male writers
Authors of Sexton Blake
20th-century English screenwriters